White Point, Nova Scotia could be the following places in Nova Scotia:

 White Point, Queens, Nova Scotia in the Region of Queens Municipality
 White Point, Victoria, Nova Scotia in Victoria County